The FIS Nordic World Ski Championships 2017 was the 40th World Championships in nordic skiing and took place in Lahti, Finland from 22 February to 5 March 2017. This was the seventh time the event has been held there, having previously been held in 1926, 1938, 1958, 1978, 1989 and 2001.

Host selection
Of the four candidate cities three had already submitted unsuccessful bids for the previous championships in 2015.

The winner was selected at the FIS Congress in South Korea on 31 May 2012. The Voting results were as following:

Schedule
All times are local (UTC+2).

Cross-country

Nordic combined

Ski jumping

Medal summary

Medal table

Top athletes
All athletes with three or more medals or at least two gold medals.

Fifteen other athletes earned 2 medals.

Cross-country skiing

Men

Women

Nordic combined

Ski jumping

Men

Women

Mixed

References

External links

Official website

 
FIS Nordic World Ski Championships
2017 in cross-country skiing
2017 in ski jumping
2017 in Nordic combined
2017 in Finnish sport
International sports competitions hosted by Finland
Sports competitions in Lahti
February 2017 sports events in Europe
March 2017 sports events in Europe
Nordic skiing competitions in Finland